The 2007 CONCACAF Gold Cup was the ninth edition of the Gold Cup, the soccer championship of North America, Central America and the Caribbean (CONCACAF), and was won by the United States over Mexico. It was contested in the United States from June 6 to 24, 2007.

This competition was the third overall edition of the tournament without guests (for the first time since 1993) from other confederations. As the winner, the United States represented CONCACAF at the 2009 FIFA Confederations Cup.

Qualified teams
A total of 12 teams qualified for the tournament. Three berths were allocated to North America, five to Central America, and four to the Caribbean.

Venues

Squads

The 12 national teams involved in the tournament were required to register a squad of 23 players; only players in these squads were eligible to take part in the tournament.

Competition format
The twelve teams that qualified were divided into three groups. The top two teams in each group advanced to the knockout stage along with the best two of the third-place teams, filling out the knockout field of eight.

If teams were level on points, they were ranked on the following criteria in order:

 Head to head matches between the tied teams (if applicable)
 Greatest goal difference in group matches
 Greatest number of goals scored in the three group matches
 If teams are still tied, CONCACAF will hold a drawing of lots

Group stage

Group A

Group B

Group C

Ranking of third-placed teams

Knockout stage

Quarter-finals

Semi-finals

Final

Statistics

Goalscorers
5 goals
 Carlos Pavón

4 goals
 Landon Donovan

3 goals

 Dwayne De Rosario
 Ali Gerba
 Walter Centeno
 Carlos Costly
 Blas Pérez

2 goals

 Julian de Guzman 
 Reynier Alcántara
 Jocelyn Angloma
 Amado Guevara
 Jared Borgetti
 José Luis Garcés
 DaMarcus Beasley

1 goal

 Iain Hume
 Jaime Colomé
 Dennis Alas
 Ramón Sánchez
 Cédrick Fiston
 David Fleurival
 Richard Socrier
 José Manuel Contreras
 Carlos Ruiz
 Alexandre Boucicaut
 Monès Chéry
 Cuauhtémoc Blanco
 Nery Castillo
 Andrés Guardado
 Pável Pardo
 Carlos Salcido
 Carlos Rivera
 Errol McFarlane
 Silvio Spann
 Carlos Bocanegra
 Brian Ching
 Clint Dempsey
 Benny Feilhaber
 Frankie Hejduk
 Eddie Johnson
 Taylor Twellman

Awards

Winners

Individual awards

All-Tournament team

The All-Tournament Team was selected by the CONCACAF Technical Study Group and features the "Best XI" along with seven Honorable Mentions. The player selections were made from the eight teams that reached the quarterfinals of the 2007 CONCACAF Gold Cup.

Controversy
During the last minutes of the semi-final match between Canada and the U.S.A., Canada's Atiba Hutchinson scored a goal that would have equalised the score for Canada. However, a linesman erroneously indicated that Hutchinson was offside, and the referee Benito Archundia subsequently nullified Hutchinson's goal. Video replays showed that the football came into contact with the U.S.A.'s defender Oguchi Onyewu immediately before Hutchinson scored the goal. Therefore, according to the laws of the game, there was no offside offence for Hutchinson.

Notes

References

External links

2007 CONCACAF Gold Cup Dates Announced
2007 CONCACAF Gold Cup (with all matchreports)

 
Gold Cup
CONCACAF Gold Cup 2007
CONCACAF Gold Cup
CONCACAF Gold Cup tournaments